Aidingibacillus  is a Gram-positive, aerobic non-spore-forming and non-motile genus of bacteria from the family of Bacillaceae with one known species (Aidingibacillus halophilus). Aidingibacillus halophilus has been isolated from a salt lake in China.

References

Bacillaceae
Bacteria genera
Monotypic bacteria genera
Bacteria described in 2021